Robert Douglas "Rob" Graves (born May 18, 1973) is an American songwriter, musician, and producer. He is most well known for his work with the band Red.

Graves has produced for bands such as, Red, Pillar, Wavorly, Kerrie Roberts and Head. He has two Grammy Award nominations for the rock band Red and is a four-time Dove Award recipient, his first in 2007 for "Breathe Into Me" (Rock Recorded Song of the Year), in 2009 for "Lost" (Rock Recorded Song of the Year) and most recently with Innocence & Instinct (Rock Album of the Year). In addition to his wins, he has received nine other Dove Award nominations.

Graves also wrote the score for the yet to be released film, Into the Darkness.

Discography

Production credits

Performance credits

Songwriting and composer credits

Awards

References 

1973 births
Living people
American male songwriters
Place of birth missing (living people)